(Samuel) Ernest Palmer, 1st Baron Palmer (28 March 1858 – 8 December 1948), known as Sir Ernest Palmer, 1st Baronet, from 1916, was a British business man and patron of music.

Palmer was the eldest son of Samuel Palmer, of Hampstead. He was educated at Malvern College. He was a Director of the family firm of Huntley & Palmers Ltd of Reading, Berkshire, the largest biscuit manufacturer in the world. However, Palmer is mostly known for his services to music. He was vice-president and a Member of the Council of the Royal College of Music and was elected its first Fellow in 1921 He was the founder of the Royal College of Music Patron's Fund, the Berkshire Scholarship and the Ernest Palmer Fund for Opera Study. He was created a Baronet, of Grosvenor Crescent in the City of Westminster in 1916, and on 24 June 1933 he was raised to the peerage as Baron Palmer, of Reading in the County of Berkshire.

Lord Palmer married Amy Christiana, daughter of George Swan Nottage, Lord Mayor of London, in 1881. She died in 1947. Lord Palmer survived her by a year and died in December 1948, aged 90. He was succeeded in his titles by his son Cecil.

Arms

References

 Samuel Palmer, 1st Baron Palmer . The Malvern Register 1865–1905, p. 41.
Kidd, Charles, Williamson, David (editors). Debrett's Peerage and Baronetage (1990 edition). New York: St Martin's Press, 1990.

Short biography

1858 births
1948 deaths
People educated at Malvern College
Barons in the Peerage of the United Kingdom
People associated with the Royal College of Music
High Sheriffs of the County of London
Directors of the Great Western Railway
Barons created by George V
Ernest